Carlo Finco (born May 27, 1968, in Curtarolo) is a former Italian cyclist.

Career achievements

Major results
1997
2nd National Time Trial Championships
3rd Giro della Romagna
3rd Trofeo Matteotti
1999
1st stage 1 Uniqa Classic
2nd Trofeo Melinda

References

1968 births
Living people
Italian male cyclists
Cyclists from the Province of Padua